Leduc is an extinct town in Gasconade County, in the U.S. state of Missouri.

A post office called Leduc was established in 1875, and remained in operation until 1895. The community has the name of the local Leduc family.

References

Ghost towns in Missouri
Former populated places in Gasconade County, Missouri